The 2008 Formula Renault 2.0 Northern European Cup was the third Formula Renault 2.0 Northern European Cup season. The season began at Hockenheim on 26 April and finished on 5 October at Spa, after sixteen races.

Motopark Academy driver Valtteri Bottas won the NEC championship title, having won twelve races during the season, bringing the team their third successive drivers' championship title. His teammates António Félix da Costa and Tobias Hegewald, completed the top three, for the team's second consecutive championship title.

Drivers and teams

Race calendar and results

Standings

Points are awarded only based on position. There are 2 races by rounds, each 25 minutes.

† — Drivers did not finish the race, but were classified as they completed over 90% of the race distance.

References

External links
 Official website of the Formula Renault 2.0 NEC championship

NEC
Formula Renault 2.0 NEC
Formula Renault 2.0 NEC
Renault NEC